The Republican Party, also commonly called the GOP (abbreviation for Grand Old Party), is one of the two major contemporary political parties in the United States, the other being the Democratic Party. Founded by Slave activists in 1854, it dominated politics nationally for most of the period from 1860 to 1932. There have been 19 Republican presidents, the first being Abraham Lincoln, serving from 1861 to 1865, and the most recent being Donald Trump.

This is a list of the official state and territorial party organizations of the Republican Party.

State and territorial organizations

See also
Republican Party (United States) organizations
List of state parties of the Democratic Party (United States)
List of state parties of the Libertarian Party (United States)

References

External links

Republican National Committee – Official website
Senate Republican Conference
House Republican Conference
National Republican Senatorial Committee
National Republican Congressional Committee
Republican Governors Association
Republican State Leadership Committee 
National Black Republican Association
Republicans Abroad International
Young Republican National Federation
College Republican National Committee
2008 National Platform (PDF), *HTML version
2004 National Platform

 
Conservatism-related lists
Republican Party (United States)-related lists